The 2019 Ashford Borough Council election took place on 2 May 2019 to elect members of Ashford Borough Council in England. This was on the same day as other local elections.

Summary

Election result

|-

Ward results

Aylesford & East Stour

Beaver

Biddenden

Bircholt

Bockhanger

Bybrook

Charing

Conningbrook & Little Burton Farm

Downs North

Downs West

Furley

Goat Lees

Godinton

Highfield

Isle of Oxney

Kennington

Kingsnorth Village & Bridgefield

Mersham, Sevington South with Finberry

Norman

Park Farm North

Park Farm South

Repton

Rolvenden & Tenterden West

Roman

Saxon Shore

Singleton East

Singleton West

Stanhope

Tenterden North

Tenterden South

Tenterden St. Michael's

Upper Weald

Victoria

Washford

Weald Central

Weald North

Weald South

Willesborough

Wye with Hinxhill

By-elections

Beaver

Downs North

Highfield

References

2019 English local elections
May 2019 events in the United Kingdom
2019
2010s in Kent